Samuel Carlton Cooley (April 15, 1898 in Milford, New Jersey – November 1981 in Stockton, New Jersey) was an American violist and composer.

Biography
Cooley studied at the Philadelphia Musical Academy with Frederick Hahn and Camille Zeckwer, and later with Percy Goetschius and Louis Svečenski at the Institute of Musical Art (Juilliard School) in New York City.

In 1919, Cooley joined the viola section of the Philadelphia Orchestra for one year before he was appointed Principal Violist of the Cleveland Orchestra in 1922, a position in which he remained until 1937. He was Principal Violist of the NBC Symphony Orchestra from 1937 to 1954 during the years of Arturo Toscanini's tenure. In 1954, upon Toscanini's retirement, Cooley joined the Philadelphia Orchestra viola section under Eugene Ormandy and was appointed Principal Violist in 1956, succeeding Harry Zaratzian. He remained with the Philadelphia Orchestra until his retirement in 1963. Cooley was also violist with the Cleveland String Quartet and NBC String Quartet.

Cooley is particularly remembered for his recordings under Toscanini and Ormandy.  He also recorded his own composition, Aria and Dance for viola and orchestra, with the Philadelphia Orchestra under Ormandy's baton.

Cooley was married to Ada Eleanor Strother (b. Liverpool UK 1886, d. Flemington NJ 1986) from August 26, 1923 until his death in November 1981. They had one child, Richard Strother Cooley (b. Cleveland OH 1924). He is the grandfather of fiction writer Martha Cooley (b. NJ 1955), whose novels include "The Archivist" and "Thirty Three Swoons"; attorney Seth van den Hoek Cooley (b. NJ 1957): children Ian David Cooley (b. PA 1987), Hannah Claire Cooley (b. PA 1989) and Benjamin Trevorrow Cooley (b. PA 1993); and archivist Karen Cooley Boysen (b. NJ 1962): children Cyril van den Hoek Boysen (b. CA 1992) and Aartdina Parry Boysen (b. CA 1995).

Selected works
Orchestral
 Eastbourne Sketches for string orchestra (1925–1926, orchestrated 1941)
     Promenade
     The Downs
     The Punch and Judy Show

Concertante
 Concertino for viola and orchestra (1937)
 Aria and Dance for viola and orchestra (1965?)

Chamber and instrumental music
 Eastbourne Sketches for string quartet (1925–1926)
 A Song and Dance for viola and piano (1927)
 Prelude and Gigue by Johann Sebastian Bach arranged for viola and piano (1938); original for cello solo
 "Vexations" on a Well-known Theme (with Apology to Schumann), Comic Sketch for string quartet (1940s)
 Etude Suite for viola solo (1962)
     Prelude
     Scherzo
     Thème Russe
     Rondino Spiccato
 Scale Studies for Viola (1964)

Recordings
Viola
 Richard Strauss: Don Quixote – Emanuel Feuermann (cello); Carlton Cooley (viola); Arturo Toscanini (conductor); NBC Symphony Orchestra (1938)
 Wolfgang Amadeus Mozart: Sinfonia Concertante for violin, viola and orchestra, K. 364 – Mischa Mischakoff (violin); Carlton Cooley (viola); Arturo Toscanini (conductor); NBC Symphony Orchestra (1941)
 Richard Strauss: Don Quixote – Frank Miller (cello); Carlton Cooley (viola); Arturo Toscanini (conductor); NBC Symphony Orchestra (1948)
 Hector Berlioz: Harold en Italie – Carlton Cooley (viola); Arturo Toscanini (conductor); NBC Symphony Orchestra (1949)
 Giorgio Federico Ghedini: Pezzo Concertante for 2 violins, viola and orchestra (1931) – Mischa Mischakoff, Max Hollander (violins); Carlton Cooley (viola); Guido Cantelli (conductor); NBC Symphony Orchestra (1949–1952)
 Richard Strauss: Don Quixote – Lorne Munroe (cello); Carlton Cooley (viola); Eugene Ormandy (conductor); Philadelphia Orchestra (1963)
 Carlton Cooley: Aria and Dance for viola and orchestra – Carlton Cooley (viola); Eugene Ormandy (conductor); Philadelphia Orchestra; First Chair Encores (1965)

Chamber music
 Elizabeth Sprague Coolidge Foundation Concerts, Library of Congress – Coolidge Quartet; Carlton Cooley (viola)
     Johannes Brahms: String Quintet in F major, Op. 88 (1882); recorded in 1943
     Johannes Brahms: String Quintet in G major, Op. 111 (1890); recorded in 1943
     Johannes Brahms: String Sextet in B major, Op. 18 (1860); recorded in 1943
     Johannes Brahms: String Sextet in G major, Op. 36 (1864–1865); recorded in 1943
 Gertrude Clarke Whittall Foundation Concerts, Library of Congress – Budapest String Quartet; Carlton Cooley (viola); Benar Heifetz (cello); Daniel Saidenberg (cello)
     Johannes Brahms: String Quintet in F major, Op. 88 (1882); recorded in 1952
     Johannes Brahms: String Sextet in B major, Op. 18 (1860); recorded in 1948 and 1951
     Johannes Brahms: String Sextet in G major, Op. 36 (1864–1865); recorded in 1948 and 1952
     Antonín Dvořák: String Sextet in A major, Op. 48 (1878); recorded in 1948 and 1951
     Wolfgang Amadeus Mozart: String Quintet in C major, K. 515 (1787); recorded in 1948
     Wolfgang Amadeus Mozart: String Quintet in D major, K. 593 (1790); recorded in 1948
     Arnold Schoenberg: Verklärte Nacht, Op. 4 (1899)
 Boris Koutzen: String Quartet No. 2 (1945) – Boris Koutzen, Bernard Robbins (violins); Carlton Cooley (viola); Harvey Shapiro (cello)
 Wolfgang Amadeus Mozart: Kegelstatt Trio, K. 498 – Sidney Forrest (clarinet), Carlton Cooley (viola); Ernő Balogh (piano)
 Pyotr Ilyich Tchaikovsky: Souvenir de Florence, Op. 70 (1890) –  Guilet String Quartet; Carlton Cooley (viola); Naoum Benditzky (cello)

Sources
 Riley, Maurice W. (1980), "Brief Biographies of Violists", The History of the Viola, Volume I, Ann Arbor, Michigan: Braun-Brumfield, p. 324.
 Philadelphia Orchestra Musicians: A Chronological Listing Retrieved 5 February 2011.

References

External links
 Carlton Cooley biography: Philadelphia Orchestra Musicians

1898 births
1981 deaths
American classical violists
American male classical composers
American classical composers
20th-century classical composers
People from Milford, New Jersey
University of the Arts (Philadelphia) alumni
20th-century American composers
20th-century American male musicians
Musicians of the Philadelphia Orchestra
20th-century violists